Saddle Mates is a 1928 American silent Western film directed by Richard Thorpe and starring Hal Taliaferro, Hank Bell and Peggy Montgomery. Two partners seek revenge on the man who has cheated them out of their ranch.

Cast
 Hal Taliaferro as John Benson 
 Hank Bell as Tim Mannick 
 J. Gordon Russell as Morgan Shelby 
 Peggy Montgomery as Betty Shelby 
 Slim Whitaker as Bob Grice 
 Lafe McKee as Grouchy Ferris 
 Edward Cecil as George Lemmer 
 Lillian Allen as Mrs. Saunders

References

Bibliography
 Langman, Larry. A Guide to Silent Westerns. Greenwood Publishing Group, 1992.

External links
 

1928 films
1928 Western (genre) films
American black-and-white films
1920s English-language films
Films directed by Richard Thorpe
Pathé Exchange films
Silent American Western (genre) films
1920s American films